The Women's 500 m time trial  was held on 17 October 2015.

Results

References

Women's 500 m time trial
European Track Championships – Women's 500 m time trial